Marek Gajdošík (born 16 August 1990) is a Slovak football striker who currently plays for the 3. liga club MŠK Púchov.

External links
Futbalnet profile
FC Nitra profile

References

1990 births
Living people
Slovak footballers
Association football forwards
FC Nitra players
TJ Baník Ružiná players
MFK Lokomotíva Zvolen players
FK Fotbal Třinec players
Expatriate footballers in the Czech Republic
MŠK Púchov players
Slovak Super Liga players